Statistics of Veikkausliiga in the 1996 season.

Overview
It was contested by 12 teams, and FC Jazz Pori won the championship.

Preliminary stage

Table

Results

Championship group

Table

Results

Relegation group

Table

Results

See also
Ykkönen (Tier 2)
Suomen Cup 1996

References
Finland - List of final tables (RSSSF)

Veikkausliiga seasons
Fin
Fin
1